Min Jin Lee (born November 11, 1968) is a Korean American author and journalist based in Harlem, New York City. Her work frequently deals with Korean and Korean American topics. She is the author of the novels Free Food for Millionaires (2007) and Pachinko (2017).

Background 
Lee was born in Seoul, South Korea. Her family came to the United States in 1976, when she was seven years old, and she grew up in Elmhurst, Queens, in New York City. Her parents owned a wholesale jewelry store on 30th Street and Broadway in Koreatown, Manhattan. As a new immigrant, she spent much time at the Queens Public Library, where she learned to read and write. She attended the Bronx High School of Science, and later studied history and was a resident of Trumbull College at Yale College in Connecticut. While at Yale she attended her first writing workshop, as part of a non-fiction writing class she had signed up for in her junior year. She also studied law at Georgetown University Law Center, later working as a corporate lawyer in New York from 1993 to 1995. She quit law due to the extreme working hours and her chronic liver disease, deciding to focus on her writing instead. She lived in Tokyo, Japan, for four years from 2007 to 2011. Lee resides in Harlem, Manhattan, with her son, Sam, and her husband, Christopher Duffy, who is half Japanese.

In 2018, Lee said that the works that most influence her as a writer are Middlemarch by George Eliot, Cousin Bette by Honoré de Balzac, and the Bible.

Lee served three consecutive seasons as an English-language columnist of South Korea's newspaper Chosun Ilbo'''s "Morning Forum" feature.

She has also lectured about writing, literature, and politics at Columbia University, Amherst College, Tufts, Loyola Marymount University, Stanford University, Johns Hopkins (SAIS), University of Connecticut, Boston College, Hamilton College, Harvard Law School, Yale University, Ewha University, Waseda University, the American School in Japan, World Women's Forum, the Tokyo American Center of the U.S. Embassy, and the Asia Society in New York, San Francisco, and Hong Kong. She is currently the writer-in-residence at Amherst College in Massachusetts.

 Personal life 
Lee is the cousin of actress Kim Hye-eun, who starred in the drama Twenty-Five Twenty-One. 

Fiction
Short fiction
Lee's short story "Axis of Happiness" won the 2004 Narrative Prize from Narrative Magazine.

Another short story by Lee, "Motherland", about a family of Koreans in Japan, was published in The Missouri Review in 2002 and won the Peden Prize for Best Short Story. A slightly modified version of the story appears in her 2017 novel Pachinko.

Lee's short stories have also been featured on NPR's Selected Shorts.

Free Food for Millionaires

Her debut novel Free Food for Millionaires was published in 2007. It was named one of the Top 10 Novels of the Year by The Times of London, NPR's Fresh Air, and USA Today; a notable novel by the San Francisco Chronicle; and a New York Times Editor's Choice. It was a selection for the Wall Street Journal Juggler Book Club, and a No. 1 Book Sense pick. The novel was published in the U.K. by Random House in 2007, in Italy by Einaudi and in South Korea by Image Box Publishing. The book has also been featured on online periodicals such as the Page 99 test and Largehearted Boy.

A 10th Anniversary edition of the novel was released by Apollo in 2017. It was announced in January 2021 that Lee and screenwriter Alan Yang had teamed up to bring Free Food for Millionaires to Netflix as a TV series.

Pachinko

In 2017 Lee released Pachinko, an epic historical novel following characters from Korea who eventually migrate to Japan. The book received strong reviews including those from The Guardian, NPR, The New York Times, The Sydney Morning Herald, The Irish Times, and Kirkus Reviews and is on the "Best Fiction of 2017" lists from Esquire, the Chicago Review of Books, Amazon.com, Entertainment Weekly, the BBC, The Guardian, and Book Riot. In a Washington Post interview, writer Roxane Gay called Pachinko her favorite book of 2017. The book was named by The New York Times as one of the 10 Best Books of 2017.Pachinko was a 2017 finalist for the National Book Award for Fiction. In August 2018, it was announced that Apple Inc. had obtained the screen rights to the novel for development as a television series for Apple TV+. The series, consisting of eight episodes, premiered in March 2022.

Non-fiction
Lee has published non-fiction in periodicals such as The New York Times, the New York Times Magazine, The Wall Street Journal, Times of London,  Condé Nast Traveler, Vogue, Travel + Leisure, and Food & Wine.

Reviews
Lee has written a number of reviews. In 2012 she wrote a review of Toni Morrison's Home in The Times of London, and also a review in the Times of London of March Was Made of Yarn, edited by David Karashima and Elmer Luke, a collection of essays, stories, poems and manga made by Japanese artists and citizens in the wake of the 2011 Tōhoku earthquake and tsunami. She also wrote Times of London reviews of Cynthia Ozick's Foreign Bodies and Jodi Picoult's Wonder Woman: Love and Murder.

Interviews
In her interview with The Metropolitan Museum of Art, Lee reveals that part of her intention with her writing is to create a sense of directed thinking out of chaos and develop some form of a unified order. 

Essays
Her essays include "Will", anthologized in Breeder – Real Life Stories from the New Generation of Mothers (Seal Press Books, 2001) and "Pushing Away the Plate" in To Be Real (edited by Rebecca Walker) (Doubleday, 1995). Lee also published a piece in the New York Times Magazine entitled "Low Tide", about her observations of the survivors of the 2011 Tōhoku earthquake and tsunami. She wrote another essay entitled Up Front: After the Earthquake in Vogue, reflecting upon her experiences living in Japan with her family after the 2011 Tohoku earthquake. Lee has also written two other essays in Vogue, including Weighing In (2008) and Crowning Glory (2007).

An essay entitled "Reading the World" that Lee wrote appears in the March 26, 2010, issue of Travel + Leisure. She also wrote an article profiling the cuisine and work of Tokyo chef Seiji Yamamoto in Food & Wine. She has also written a piece for the Barnes & Noble review entitled Sex, Debt, and Revenge: Balzac’s Cousin Bette.

Her interviews and essays have also been profiled in online periodicals such as Chekhov's Mistress ("My Other Village: Middlemarch by George Eliot"), Moleskinerie ("Pay Yourself First"), and ABC News ("Biblical Illiteracy or Reading the Bestseller").

Other essays by Lee have been anthologized in The Mark Twain Anthology: Great Writers on His Life and Works, Why I'm a Democrat (Ed. Susan Mulcahy), One Big Happy Family, Sugar in My Bowl and Global and the Intimate: Feminism in Our Time.

Bibliography

Short stories
 Axis of Happiness (2004) – 2004 Narrative Prize from Narrative Magazine Motherland (2002) – William Peden Prize for Best Short Story, The Missouri ReviewNovels
 Free Food for Millionaires (2007), Grand Central Publishing, .Pachinko (2017), Grand Central Publishing, 

Accolades
She received the NYFA (New York Foundation for the Arts) Fellowship for Fiction, the Peden Prize from The Missouri Review for Best Story, and The Narrative Prize for New and Emerging Writer.

While at Yale, she was awarded the Henry Wright Prize for Nonfiction and the James Ashmun Veech Prize for Fiction.

In 2017, Lee was a finalist for the National Book Award for fiction for her novel Pachinko. That book was runner-up in the 2018 Dayton Literary Peace Prize in Fiction.

See also
 Koreans in New York City
 Koreatown, Queens
 Koreatown, Manhattan
 New Yorkers in journalism

References

External links

Min Jin Lee: Official homepage
Author Min Jin Lee: 'Free Food For Millionaires' at NPR
On-Point Radio with Tom Ashbrook: Min Jin Lee (Broadcast)
Min Jin Lee's Largehearted Boy Book Notes essay for Free Food for Millionaires
Motherland (full text), from The Missouri ReviewPachinko - The struggle of destiny  book review from Whatbooktoreadnext.com''

1968 births
South Korean emigrants to the United States
American writers of Korean descent
Living people
Yale College alumni
Georgetown University Law Center alumni
21st-century American novelists
American women novelists
American women short story writers
21st-century American women writers
21st-century American short story writers
People from Elmhurst, Queens